Major-General Henry ("Harry") Osborne Curtis CB, DSO, MC, DL (18 November 1888 – 28 January 1964) was a British Army officer who saw service in both the First and the Second World Wars. During the latter, he commanded the 46th Infantry Division during the Battle of France in 1940, and later the 49th (West Riding) Infantry Division during the Occupation of Iceland from 1940 to 1942.

Early life
Curtis was born 18 November 1888. He was the son of Osborne Sargent Curtis, an American-born graduate of Trinity College, Cambridge, and Frances Henrietta Gandy. His paternal uncle was the artist Ralph Wormeley Curtis (1854–1922) and his grandfather was the American lawyer and banker, Daniel Sargent Curtis (1825–1908).

Military career
After being educated at Eton College, Curtis attended the Royal Military College, Sandhurst, from where he was commissioned in the King's Royal Rifle Corps (KRRC) in 1908. He saw service during the First World War in France, Salonika and in Palestine. He was mentioned in dispatches three times and wounded three times; he was awarded the MC in 1917, and the DSO in 1919 and ended the conflict as a battalion commander, commanding the 4th Battalion, KRRC.

Soon afterwards, in 1920, he attended the Staff College, Quetta, and served from 1922 to 1926 with the headquarters of Middle East Command, before returning to the United Kingdom to serve on the directing staff at the Staff College, Camberley.

He returned to regimental duty when he was assigned as commanding officer (CO) of the 1st Battalion, KRRC, a post he held from 1931 to 1934. From 1934 until 1936 he commanded British troops in Palestine before again returning to the United Kingdom and the Staff College, Camberley, again as an instructor. In 1938 he assumed command of the 3rd Infantry Brigade.

He commanded the brigade, part of Major-General Sir Harold Alexander's 1st Infantry Division, from 1938 to 1939. Handing over the brigade to Brigadier Thomas Wilson, a fellow KRRC officer, he was sent home from France in December 1939 and promoted to acting major-general on 21 December (with seniority backdated to 18 July 1938), to assume command of the 46th Division. Curtis rejoined the British Expeditionary Force (BEF) with his division in April 1940. Evacuated from Dunkirk, he was appointed to command the 49th (West Riding) Infantry Division in June 1940 which, at a reduced establishment, was detailed to occupy Iceland. Curtis spent the next two years in charge of his division from his office in Reykjavik. Made commander of Salisbury Plain District 1943, he was appointed commander of the Hampshire District in 1944 and the Dorset District in 1945. He retired from the army in 1946.

The family donated his medals to the Royal Green Jackets Museum but, at some point, some of the original medals have been substituted and were found for sale on the open market.

Personal life
Curtis was married to Jean Mackenzie Low (1894–1977), the daughter of John L. Low of Butterstone, Perthshire. He was the father of four sons, two of whom were killed in action, Richard Osborne Curtis (d. 1944) and Philip Evelyn Curtis (d. 1943).

References

Bibliography

External links
British Army Officers 1939–1945
Generals of World War II

|-

|-

1888 births
1964 deaths
British Army major generals
British Army generals of World War II
British Army personnel of World War I
British people of American descent
Companions of the Distinguished Service Order
Companions of the Order of the Bath
Deputy Lieutenants of Dorset
Foreign recipients of the Distinguished Service Medal (United States)
Graduates of the Royal Military College, Sandhurst
Graduates of the Staff College, Quetta
King's Royal Rifle Corps officers
People educated at Eton College
Recipients of the Military Cross
Recipients of the Distinguished Service Medal (US Army)
Burials in Dorset
Academics of the Staff College, Camberley